Achondrostoma occidentale  is a species of freshwater fish in the family Cyprinidae. This fish is from Portugal.

References 

Achondrostoma
Fish described in 2005
Endemic fauna of Portugal
Endemic fish of the Iberian Peninsula